Dear Agony is the fourth studio album by American rock band Breaking Benjamin. It was released on September 29, 2009. A Best Buy edition, Japanese import version, and Zune exclusive version were also released, all of which feature bonus content. This is the first album to feature writing credits from members of the band other than Benjamin Burnley. It is also the final studio album to feature guitarist Aaron Fink and bassist Mark Klepaski, who were both fired from the band in 2011, as well as drummer Chad Szeliga, who left the band due to creative differences in 2013.

History
Breaking Benjamin began writing for Dear Agony during 2008. The recording process began in September, leading to its release one year later. The cover of the album is an MRI scan of frontman Benjamin Burnley's head. Burnley has cited Dear Agony as the first album he has written sober. After the album's release, it entered the Billboard 200 chart at number four, selling roughly 134,000 copies in its first week, slightly more than Phobia. It also topped the iTunes download charts in the first week of its release. Dear Agony was certified Platinum by the RIAA on July 11, 2016, and has sold 877,000 copies as of July 2016.

The album's song "Lights Out" was used to promote the video game Halo: Reach.

Promotion
On September 23, 2009, Breaking Benjamin released an online browser game constructed from Adobe Flash which is a parody of Altered Beast, aptly titled "Altered Benjamin". The game contains three levels and plays the same as the original, except the player controls vocalist Benjamin Burnley and the three bosses are each other member of the band respectively. The game also features the debut of the songs, "Fade Away" and "Crawl".

Limited edition copies of Dear Agony purchased at Best Buy also included a bonus DVD that features the band's six music videos, including a previously unreleased version of the video for "I Will Not Bow". The version on the DVD is of the band only and does not contain any footage from the feature-film Surrogates, unlike the main version released online.

On September 29, 2009, "I Will Not Bow" was released as a downloadable track for the video games Rock Band and Rock Band 2. On February 16, 2010, "Give Me a Sign", another single of the album, as well singles from previous release "Until the End" and "Sooner or Later" (being from Phobia and We Are Not Alone, respectively,) were released as downloadable content for Guitar Hero 5.

Singles
"I Will Not Bow" was released for sale on August 31 as the album's first single. It was released to the radio and the band's Myspace page on August 11, 2009 instead of the planned date, August 17, 2009 due to a leak by their hometown radio station, WBSX. This single is featured in the film Surrogates, with the music video containing scenes from the movie. On November 13, 2009, the official music video for "I Will Not Bow" was released on YouTube. The original version of the music video, however, did not contain scenes from the movie Surrogates.

"Give Me a Sign" was released as a radio single on January 5, 2010. The music video was released on March 10, 2010 through the band's Myspace website and also on Vevo. The video can also be seen on YouTube.

According to AOL Radio Blog and Rawkpit.com, "Lights Out" was announced as the third single and it went to radio on June 15, according to All Access.

Critical reception

Dear Agony received mixed to positive reviews. Tim Grierson of About.com stated "Ultimately, Dear Agony demonstrates Breaking Benjamin's craftsmanship if not their brilliant creativity," but felt the release "[...] lacks something the truly excellent rock bands have – the ability to surprise the listener.  James Christopher Monger from AllMusic noted that the band's "fourth foray into the crowded waters of early 21st century alternative metal/post-grunge feels a lot like their first three. That's good news for longtime fans of the brooding Pennsylvania quartet." Monger compared the album's sound to that of a "well-oiled machine". Consequence writer Alex Young gave the disc a negative review, saying "[..] the album as a whole feels dated and charmless," and that the anthology "[... felt] as if Breaking Benjamin just has not even bothered trying."

Track listing

Personnel

Breaking Benjamin
Benjamin Burnley – lead and backing vocals, rhythm guitar
Aaron Fink – lead guitar
Mark Klepaski – bass
Chad Szeliga – drums, percussions

Additional musicians
 Rachel Golub – violin on "Anthem of the Angels" and "Without You"
 David Eggar – cello on "Anthem of the Angels" and "Without You"
 Jonathan Dinklage – violin, viola on "Anthem of the Angels" and "Without You"

Production
David Bendeth – producer, mixer
 Dan Korneff – engineer, digital editing
 Ted Jensen – mastering
 Jon D'Uva – digital editing, engineer
 John Bender – digital editing, engineer
 Kato Khandwala – digital editing, engineer
 Michael "Mitch" Milan – assistant engineer
 Jason Jordan – A&R
 Florian Schneider – photography
 David Snow – creative director

Chart positions

Weekly charts

Year-end charts

Certifications

References

2009 albums
Albums produced by David Bendeth
Breaking Benjamin albums
Hollywood Records albums